Ernest Bokroš (born 25 August 1959) is a Slovak ice hockey coach. He was the head coach of the Slovakia men's national junior ice hockey team at the 2015 World Junior Ice Hockey Championships.

References

1959 births
Living people
Slovak ice hockey coaches
Slovak ice hockey defencemen
HK Dukla Trenčín players
Sportspeople from Karviná
Czechoslovak ice hockey defencemen
Czechoslovak expatriate sportspeople in Germany
Slovak expatriate ice hockey players in Finland
Czechoslovak expatriate ice hockey people
Expatriate ice hockey players in Germany
ESV Kaufbeuren players